Gitarkameratene is the name of a supergroup of well-known Norwegian recording and touring artists. The group included Lillebjørn Nilsen, Halvdan Sivertsen, Jan Eggum and Øystein Sunde. The name Gitarkameratene means approx. "The guitar buddies".
 
The four singers used the name for the first time when they toured together in 1988. They released two records. The second recording, "Typisk Norsk" / Typically Norwegian (1990), sold 60–70,000 units. Since then the group has played together on various occasions. While all four worked on their own material, they also worked and appeared together in concerts and on recordings.

When four other Norwegian artists (Espen Lind, Kurt Nilsen, Askil Holm and Alejandro Fuentes) have played together, they have often been referred to as De nye Gitarkameratene ("The new guitar buddies"). One example of this was an article appearing in the Norwegian tabloid, VG. The four have not used this name officially. However, the term has been used in the press, causing Lillebjørn Nilsen to send a letter of protest to Espen Lind, who replied and said that they had not used the name officially and that they actually did not feel comfortable with using the name themselves.

Norwegian musical groups
Grappa Music artists